Georgia's 9th congressional district is a congressional district in the north of the U.S. state of Georgia. The district is represented by  Republican Andrew Clyde, who succeeded fellow Republican Doug Collins. The district is mostly rural and exurban in character, though it stretches into Hall County (home to Gainesville) and some of Gwinnett County on Atlanta's northern fringe.

The district has a heavy Republican lean. Donald Trump carried the district with almost 78 percent of the vote in 2016, his fourth-best showing in the nation. With a Cook Partisan Voting Index of R+30, it is the most Republican district in Georgia, the fourth-most Republican district in the nation, and the second-most Republican district in the Eastern Time Zone. Since then-congressman and future governor Nathan Deal switched parties in 1995, no Democrat running in the district has crossed the 40 percent mark, and only one Democrat has won as much as 30 percent.

Republicans are no less dominant at the state and local level. Even as the district turned increasingly Republican at the national level (Jimmy Carter is the only Democratic presidential candidate to carry the district since 1960), conservative Democrats still held most local offices well into the 1990s. However, after Deal's party switch, Republicans gradually eroded the Democratic advantage, with the help of other party switchers. Today, there are almost no elected Democrats above the county level. Republicans typically win with margins of well over 70 percent of the vote on the occasions they face opposition at all.

Much of this district was the 10th district from 2003 to 2007; it became the 9th once again in a mid-decade redistricting.

Four-term Republican Doug Collins announced in January 2020 that he would run for U.S. senator. Clyde won a crowded Republican primary-the real contest in this district-and won handily in November.

Counties in the district

2003–2013 
 Catoosa
 Dade
 Dawson
 Fannin
 Forsyth (Partial, see also )
 Gilmer
 Gordon (Partial, see also )
 Habersham
 Hall
 Jackson
 Lumpkin
 Murray
 Pickens 
 Union
 White
 Walker
 Whitfield

2013–2023 
 Banks
 Clarke (Partial, see also )
 Dawson
 Elbert
 Fannin
 Forsyth (Partial, see also )
 Franklin
 Gilmer
 Habersham
 Hall
 Hart
 Jackson 
 Lumpkin
 Madison
 Pickens (Partial)
 Rabun
 Stephens
 Towns
 Union
 White

Recent results in presidential elections

List of members representing the district

Election results

2006

2008

2010 special election

Nathan Deal resigned March 21, 2010 to run for Governor of Georgia. A special election was held on June 8, 2010.

2010 general election

2012

Following redistricting, Tom Graves moved to the newly created 14th district.

2014

2016

2018

2020

2022

Historical district boundaries

See also
Georgia's congressional districts
List of United States congressional districts

References

 Congressional Biographical Directory of the United States 1774–present

External links
 PDF map of Georgia's 9th district at nationalatlas.gov
 Georgia's 9th district at GovTrack.us

09